Amaia Erbina (born 13 March 1997) is a Spanish rugby sevens player. She was selected for the Spanish sevens team for the 2016 Summer Olympics. She was also part of the squad that won the 2016 Women's Rugby Sevens Final Olympic Qualification Tournament in Dublin, Ireland for a place at the Olympics.

Erbina competed at the 2022 Rugby World Cup Sevens in Cape Town.

References

External links 
 

1997 births
Living people
Spain international women's rugby sevens players
Rugby union players from the Basque Country (autonomous community)
Olympic rugby sevens players of Spain
Rugby sevens players at the 2016 Summer Olympics
People from Ordizia
Sportspeople from Gipuzkoa